Kyllo v. United States, 533 U.S. 27 (2001), was a decision by the Supreme Court of the United States in which the court ruled that the use of thermal imaging devices to monitor heat radiation in or around a person's home, even if conducted from a public vantage point, is unconstitutional without a search warrant. In its majority opinion, the court held that thermal imaging constitutes a "search" under the Fourth Amendment, as the police were using devices to "explore details of the home that would previously have been unknowable without physical intrusion." The ruling has been noted for refining the reasonable expectation of privacy doctrine in light of new surveillance technologies, and when those are used in areas that are accessible to the public.

Background 
In 1991, federal agents with the United States Department of the Interior received a tip that Danny Lee Kyllo was growing marijuana in his home in Florence, Oregon. The agents used an FLIR thermal imaging device outside Kyllo's home, which revealed unusual heat patterns and an unusual amount of heat radiating from the roof and side walls compared with the rest of the house, leading the agents to believe he was using high-intensity halide lamps that are common in cannabis cultivation. The scan was conducted from a parked car across the street, without a search warrant. The thermograms gathered from the scan were used to obtain a warrant for a subsequent search of the house, and during that search federal agents found more than 100 marijuana plants. Kyllo was charged with one count of manufacturing marijuana.

At a preliminary hearing, the court denied Kyllo's motion to suppress the evidence obtained from the thermal imaging search, ruling that the device could not "penetrate walls or windows to reveal conversations or human activities" and that the device "recorded only heat being emitted from the home". Kyllo entered a conditional guilty plea before appealing to the Ninth Circuit Court of Appeals on the grounds that observations with a thermal-imaging device constituted a search under the Fourth Amendment. The Ninth Circuit ultimately upheld admission of the evidence and allowed criminal trying proceedings to continue. Kyllo then petitioned the Supreme Court for a writ of certiorari, which was granted in 2000.

Opinion of the Court
At the Supreme Court, the government defended the use of thermal imaging technology on two grounds: first, that thermal imaging was not an invasion of privacy, because the devices could not reveal any intimate details of the home; and second, that heat radiation can be detected in several ways from a public vantage point without the aid of technology, such as observing snow melt or smoke rise.

In a majority opinion written by Justice Antonin Scalia, the Supreme Court ruled that the thermal imaging of Kyllo's home constituted a "search" within the meaning of the Fourth Amendment. By a 5–4 margin, the court held that a search warrant must be obtained before the government, including the police and federal agents, may use a thermal imaging device to monitor the heat and radiation of one's home. Scalia also noted the surveillance powers that could be abused by the police with technologies that are "not in general public use". As the police did not have a warrant when they used the device outside of Kyllo's home, the search was unconstitutional. 

Scalia wrote: "Where, as here, the Government uses a device that is not in general public use, to explore details of the home that would previously have been unknowable without physical intrusion, the surveillance is a ‘search’ and is presumptively unreasonable without a warrant." The majority opinion argued that a person has an expectation of privacy in his or her home, and therefore, the government cannot conduct unreasonable searches, even with technology that does not enter the home.

The Kyllo decision, relying on Katz v. United States (1967), confirmed the expectation of privacy in one's home, and limited the means by which the government can explore the home without a warrant. Scalia referred to the firm but bright line drawn at the entrance of a home, where the Fourth Amendment is said to recognize a heightened expectation of privacy. Furthermore, Scalia discussed how future technologies could invade one's right of privacy. Scalia argued that the Framers of the Constitution would agree that such technology would be intrusive enough to warrant a search, if they knew it existed, and as such, that technology (including thermal imaging) calls for the same warrant requirements as physical intrusion. 

Scalia structured the opinion to protect against more sophisticated surveillance technology that might arise in the future. This was intended to protect the home from all types of warrantless surveillance and is an interpretation of what Scalia called "the long view" of the Fourth Amendment.

Dissenting opinion

In a dissenting opinion authored by Justice John Paul Stevens, the minority argued that the use of thermal imaging does not constitute a Fourth Amendment "search" because any person could detect the heat emissions. Stevens argued that this could be done simply by feeling that some areas in or around the house are warmer than others, or by observing that snow was melting more quickly on certain sections of the house. Since the public could gather this information on their own, it was therefore not unconstitutional for the government to do the same. The dissenting opinion asserted that the use of the thermal imaging device was merely "off-the-wall" surveillance because it did not detect any "intimate" details of Kyllo's home. According to Stevens, "Heat waves, like aromas that are generated in a kitchen, or in a laboratory or opium den, enter the public domain if and when they leave a building."

Stevens especially criticized Scalia's invocation of the bright line test, calling it "unnecessary, unwise, and inconsistent with the Fourth Amendment", because this would be defunct as soon as the surveillance technology used went into general public use, as opposed to only being used by the police.

Impact and subsequent developments 

Scalia's use of the phrases "sense-enhancing technology" and "device that is not in general public use" in the Kyllo ruling has become influential in later rulings on police search procedures, but in an inconsistent fashion. Several scholars and legal analysts noted the ambiguity in Scalia's use of those phrases. Orin Kerr wrote that such phrases "can be read plausibly as suggesting a broad and even creative view of how the Fourth Amendment should respond when technology threatens privacy." One journalist argued that this phrasing "sets up an unfortunate and unnecessary test that could erode our privacy as new technologies become more widespread." Another legal scholar called this phrasing "vague" and "considering the rapid pace of which technology is advancing daily, troublesome to say the least"; while "general public use" was not adequately defined.

Drone surveillance 
Some analysts questioned whether the Kyllo opinion allows the government to conduct drone surveillance on suspected criminals without a warrant, largely because drones are now commonly used by the public. Raymond Nhan compared drone surveillance by law enforcement officials to the thermal imaging carried out on Danny Lee Kyllo, arguing that they can both be used to invade someone's privacy, and stressed that there's "no clear answer" on where drone technology falls in line with the Kyllo ruling. Another analyst pointed out that modern drones employ infrared technology far more advanced than the scanner used on Kyllo, and drones are currently available to the general public to purchase, seemingly putting them in "general public use" according to Scalia's test. Veronica McKnight argued that modern drones are more commonplace than thermal imaging devices, and capable of surveillance that far outweighs the scans done on Kyllo.

Police dog searches 

Other analysts questioned whether drug-sniffing police dogs fell in the same category as thermal imaging devices under the Kyllo opinion. During oral arguments in the Kyllo case, Justice Sandra Day O'Connor posed that dog sniffs would be considered unconstitutional if compared to thermal imaging, despite the Supreme Court previously upholding their constitutionality in United States v. Place (1983).  In the dissenting opinion in Kyllo, Stevens opined that the majority's phrasing was too broad, writing that under this new precedent, dog sniffs would be considered a search, and therefore unconstitutional without a warrant, which would effectively nullify the Place precedent.

Shannon Hurley-Deal agreed that police dogs should count as sense-enhancing technology in light of Kyllo, pointing out that a dog's sense of smell is much stronger and more enhanced than that of a human's. Tracey Maclin agreed, writing that a drug-detecting dog, like a thermal imaging device, is a "law enforcement device that allows the police to obtain information regarding the interior of a home", and noted the conflict between the Kyllo and Place rulings.

In 2005, the Supreme Court reconciled the conflict between Kyllo and Place, holding in Illinois v. Caballes that a search by a police dog was not the same as a search by thermal imaging. In 2013, the Supreme Court held in Florida v. Jardines that drug-sniffing police dogs could not be brought to the front door of a person's house without a search warrant, but they did so on the basis of trespass against property rights rather than the right to privacy. Justice Elena Kagan added that police dogs count as "devices not in general public use" as understood by the Kyllo court.

See also
 List of United States Supreme Court cases, volume 533

References

External links

 Transcript of oral argument
 Brief of the Solicitor General
 Amicus brief of the ACLU

United States Supreme Court cases
United States Supreme Court cases of the Rehnquist Court
United States Fourth Amendment case law
United States privacy case law
2001 in United States case law
2001 in cannabis
Search and seizure case law
Infrared imaging
Cannabis law reform in the United States
Lane County, Oregon